Omkareshwara Hill is a small hill in Rajarajeshwari Nagar in South Bangalore. With 2800 ft above the sea level this place is one of the highest points in Bangalore.

It is home to Matsya Narayana Temple and Dwadasha Jyotirlinga Temple.

A clock tower on Omkar Hills is the second largest in the world, according to an article in The Hindu.

References 

Geography of Bangalore